Centaurium (centaury) is a genus of 20 species in the gentian family (Gentianaceae), tribe Chironieae, subtribe Chironiinae. The genus was named after the centaur Chiron, famed in Greek mythology for his skill in medicinal herbs. It is distributed across Europe and into Asia.

Until 2004, Centaurium was given a much wider circumscription, comprising about 50 species ranging across Europe, Asia, the Americas, Australasia and the Pacific. However this circumscription was polyphyletic, so in 2004 the genus was split in four, being Centaurium sensu stricto, Zeltnera, Gyrandra and Schenkia.

Species

 Centaurium barrelieri (Duf.) F. Q. & Rothm.
 Centaurium bianoris (Sennen) Sennen
 Centaurium calycosum (Buckley) Fernald
 Centaurium capense Broome
 Centaurium centaurioides (Roxb.) Rolla Rao & Hemadri
 Centaurium chloodes (Brot.) Samp.
 Centaurium davyi (Jeps.) Abrams
 Centaurium erythraea Rafn
 Centaurium exaltatum (Griseb.) W. Wight ex Piper 
 Centaurium favargeri Zeltner
 Centaurium gypsicola (Boiss. & Reut.) Ronniger
 Centaurium littorale (D. Turner) Gilmour
 Centaurium mairei Zeltner
 Centaurium majus (Hoffmgg. & Link) Ronniger
 Centaurium malzacianum Maire
 Centaurium maritimum (L.) Fritch
 Centaurium pulchellum (Sw.) Druce
 Centaurium quadrifolium (L.) 
 Centaurium scilloides (L. fil.) Samp.
 Centaurium serpentinicola A. Carlström
 Centaurium somedanum Lainz
 Centaurium suffruticosum (Griseb.) Ronniger
 Centaurium tenuiflorum (Hoffmgg. & Link) Fritsch
 Centaurium turcicum (Velen.) Ronnige

See also
 Zeltnera muehlenbergii - formerly C. muehlenbergii
 Zeltnera namophila - formerly C. namophila
 Zeltnera venusta - formerly C. venustum

References

External links

Gentian Research Network

 
Gentianaceae genera
Flora of Europe